Capvern (Gascon: Capvèrn) is a commune in the Hautes-Pyrénées department in south-western France. Capvern station has rail connections to Toulouse, Tarbes and Pau.

See also
 Communes of the Hautes-Pyrénées department

References

Communes of Hautes-Pyrénées